The Edge of Infinity is the third full-length album by the Swiss band Lunatica. It was released on August 28, 2006. A release party took place at Schützi in Olten (Switzerland) on September 23, 2006.

The band had originally held a poll to pick a cover song to include on the album, although they decided not to include any cover song after all, having enough of their own compositions for the album.

Track listing
 "Introduction" - 1:56
 "The Edge of Infinity" - 4:08
 "Sons of the Wind" - 5:25
 "Who You Are" - 3:41
 "Out!" - 3:42
 "Song for You" (feat. John Payne) - 4:09
 "Together" - 4:02
 "The Power of Love" - 5:17
 "Words Unleashed" - 4:15
 "EmOcean" - 8:50 (feat. Oliver Hartmann in some versions)

Videos
A video for Song for You was released in early 2007 in the band's official website.

Charts

References

Lunatica albums
2006 albums
Frontiers Records albums